The Electronic Medicines Compendium is a provider of information on medicines, produced by Datapharm. It lists summaries of product characteristics and patient information leaflets.

References

External links

Pharmacy in the United Kingdom
Professional associations based in the United Kingdom
Medical manuals